Taytu Betul ( Ṭaytu Bəṭul ; baptised as Wälättä Mikael; 1851 – 11 February 1918) was Empress of Ethiopia from 1889 to 1913 and the third wife of Emperor Menelik II. An influential figure in anti-colonial resistance during the late 19th-century Scramble for Africa, she, along with her husband, founded the modern Ethiopian capital Addis Ababa in 1886.

Early life 
According to Raymond Jonas, Taytu Betul (or Taitu) was born in Semien, North Gondar, Ethiopian Empire. Scholarly consensus is that she was born at about 1851.

Taytu's father, Ras Betul Haile Maryam, was part of the ruling family of Semien that claimed to be descendants of the Solomonic Dynasty through Emperor Susenyos I. Taytu's uncle was the Amhara warlord Wube Haile Maryam who governed the Semien and Tigray princedom.

Education 
There are no records indicating that Empress Taytu attended school; however, she was taught to read and write in Amharic and Ge'ez. This is a rarity, considering that during this time period it was unlikely for women to be educated. It is believed that she was taught diplomacy, politics and economics. Additionally, she understood a language once exclusive to the Ethiopian Orthodox liturgy.

Hobbies 
Empress Taytu was known to play the begena, which is a 10-string instrument. Her other activities included playing Senterej, Ethiopian chess, and an interest writing poetry.

Family history 
Historically, her family is claimed to have a ruling foothold in the Northern region of the country. Such places include: Semien, Begemeder, Lasta, Yejju and Wello. Her aristocratic lineage dates back to 1607–32, descending from the daughter of Emperor Susneyos. Her great-grandfather, Ras Gebre of Simien, ruled for 44 years during the period known as the Zemene Mesafint, or the "Era of the Princes". His fame was acknowledged through two measures. He was responsible for making the communities west of Gondar pay taxes in gold, as well as treating his subjects so well – providing an ample amount of food and drink so that they no longer needed to farm to sustain themselves. Her grandfather, Dejazmach Haile Maryam Gebre, also held a respected title. He governed Simien, where his children Wube, Betul and Merso were born. Additionally, her uncle Degazmach Wube followed in the family's footsteps by also acquiring a high position in the region. As the half-brother of Taytu's father, Degazmach Wube was responsible for ruling the Tigray province. Taytu had two brothers (Ras Welle Betul & Temru Betul) and two sisters.

Personal life 
In her fourth and final marriage, Taytu Betul married King Menelik of Shewa, who would later become Emperor of Ethiopia.

Political contributions 
Taytu is acknowledged to have wielded considerable political power both before and after she and Menelik were crowned Emperor and Empress in 1889. She led the conservative faction at court that resisted the modernists and progressives who wanted to develop Ethiopia along western lines and bring modernity to the country. According to the historians, she was always consulted by the Emperor prior to making important decisions. Thus, Empress Taytu was a key player in the conflict over the Treaty of Wuchale with Italy, which she tore up. Empress Taytu was the first to motivate the hesitant Emperor and other men to stand up against the Italians. Deeply suspicious of European intentions towards Ethiopia, she was a key player in the conflict over the Treaty of Wuchale with Italy, in which the Italian version made Ethiopia an Italian protectorate, while the Amharic version did not do so.  The Empress held a hard line against the Italians, and when talks eventually broke down, and Italy invaded the Empire from its Eritrean colony, she marched north with the Emperor and the Imperial Army, commanding a force of cannoneers at the historic Battle of Adwa that resulted in a humiliating defeat for Italy in March 1896. This victory was the most significant of any African army battling European colonialism. Menelik II and Taytu Betul were temporarily in possession of 70,000 prisoners of war. Menelik, who often prevaricated and postponed unpleasant decisions by answering "Yes, tomorrow" (Ishi, nega), found it useful to have his wife be in a powerful enough position to say "Absolutely not" (Imbi) to people and issues he just did not want to personally offend or refuse.

When Menelik's health began to decline around 1906, Taytu began to make decisions on his behalf, angering her rivals for power through her appointment of favorites and relatives to most of the positions of power and influence. As a means to curb her family's political influence at court, Menelik selected Sabla Wangel Hailu as the heir-presumptive Lij Iyasu's wife, as her family had no ties to Taytu's. Taytu was widely resented for her alleged Gonderine xenophobia and nepotism, and the nobility of Shoa and Tigray, along with the Wollo relatives of Lij Iyasu conspired to remove her from state responsibility. In 1910, she was forced from power, and a regency under Ras Tessema Nadew took over.  Instructed to limit herself to the care of her stricken husband, Taytu faded from the political scene. Taytu and Menelik did not have any children. Menelik died in 1913 and was succeeded by his grandson from a daughter of a previous liaison, Lij Iyasu.  Taytu was banished to the old Palace at Entoto, next to the St. Mary's church she had founded years before, and where her husband had been crowned Emperor.

While some believe Taytu may have played a part in the plot that eventually removed Emperor Iyasu V from the throne in 1916, replacing him with Empress Zauditu, the price for Zauditu's elevation was a divorce from Taytu's nephew Ras Gugsa Welle, who became governor of Begemder. Zauditu, Menelik II's daughter by yet another previous marriage, had always been close to Empress Taytu and invited Taytu to live with her. Although Taytu declined she resumed advising rulers "in a modest way," to quote Chris Prouty.

Later years 
Taytu lived out the next few years at the old palace next to the Entoto Maryam Church overlooking Addis Ababa. She requested permission to go to Gondar in November 1917 to end her days, but was refused; she died three months later. She is buried next to her husband at the Taeka Negest Ba'eta Le Mariam Monastery in Addis Ababa.

Notes

Bibliography 
 Chris Prouty. Empress Taytu and Menilek II: Ethiopia 1883–1910. Trenton: The Red Sea Press, 1986.

External links 

Women Leaders in Africa

|-

African resistance to colonialism
Empresses and imperial consorts of Ethiopia
Women in 19th-century warfare
African women in war
1850s births
1918 deaths
Women in war 1900–1945
19th-century Ethiopian people
19th-century Ethiopian women
20th-century Ethiopian people
20th-century Ethiopian women